Claude Foussier (19 April 1925 – 13 December 2010) was a French sports shooter. Foussier competed in the trap event at the 1960 Summer Olympics.

References

1925 births
2010 deaths
French male sport shooters
Olympic shooters of France
Shooters at the 1960 Summer Olympics
Shooters at the 1964 Summer Olympics
Sport shooters from Paris
20th-century French people